Legal immunity, or immunity from prosecution, is a legal status wherein an individual or entity cannot be held liable for a violation of the law, in order to facilitate societal aims that outweigh the value of imposing liability in such cases. Such legal immunity may be from criminal prosecution, or from civil liability (being subject of lawsuit), or both. The most notable forms of legal immunity are parliamentary immunity and witness immunity. One author has described legal immunity as "the obverse of a legal power":

Criticism
Legal immunities may be subject to criticism because they institute a separate standard of conduct for those who receive them. For example, as one author notes:

Types

Immunity of government leaders
Many forms of immunity are granted to government leaders to rule over the world, continent, nation,  province,  urban area and rural area without fear of being sued or charged with a crime for so doing: 
Sovereign immunity, the prevention of lawsuits or prosecution against rulers or governments without their given consent
Sovereign immunity in the United States bars suit against federal, state, and tribal governments, which cannot be sued without their consent.  Governmental consent to be sued is expressed through legislation as a limited waiver of sovereign immunity  
Parliamentary immunity, immunity granted to government leaders during their tenure and in the course of their duties
Speech or Debate Clause, a provision in the United States Constitution that provides immunity to members of Congress for statements made in either house
Immunity from prosecution (international law), exclusion of elected officials from prosecution under international law
State immunity, principle of international law that the government of a state is not amenable before the courts of another state

Immunity of government officials
Judicial immunity, the absolute immunity of a judiciary in the course of their official duties
Qualified immunity, in the United States, sovereign immunity of all government officials and government employees performing tasks as part of the government's actions
Absolute immunity, a type of sovereign immunity for all government officials and government employees that confers total immunity when acting in the course of their duties
Diplomatic immunity, agreement between sovereign governments to exclude diplomats from local laws because grants of immunity are particularly important in intergovernmental relations, where traditions have arisen to prevent the federal civil servants of a country's foreign service cadre from being harassed by their host countries.

Such immunities may be granted by law (statutory or constitutional) or by treaty.

Immunity of resident citizens of a country participating in the legal process
Amnesty law, a law that provides immunity for past crimes
Spousal privilege, also called spousal immunity, protects a spouse from testifying against the defendant
Witness immunity, immunity granted to a witness in exchange for testimony

Immunity of private officials
Reporter's privilege, a limited First Amendment right many jurisdictions by statutory law or judicial decision have by which journalists may not be prosecuted for protecting their confidential sources from discovery

Immunity of nonprofit organizations 
Charitable immunity, immunity from liability granted to charities in many countries from the 19th century to the mid-20th century

Such immunities may be granted by law or, for witness immunity, by prosecutors or other authorities on a case-by-case basis, commonly as an agreement with the witnesses.

See also
Ratlines
Parish transfers of abusive Catholic priests
Gypsy cop
Rendition (law)
Impunity
Judgment proof

References

 
Legal doctrines and principles